Ian Paul Livingston, Baron Livingston of Parkhead (born 28 July 1964), is a Scottish businessman who was formerly chief executive of BT Group. A Conservative member of the House of Lords, he previously served as the UK government's Minister of State for Trade and Investment.

He was created a life peer on 15 July 2013 taking the title Baron Livingston of Parkhead.

Early and personal life
The fourth generation son of Polish-Lithuanian Jews who arrived in Scotland 120 years ago, Livingston's family owned a factory making flying jackets and police uniforms. Brought up in Kelvinside, his father was a general practitioner who practised medicine in Parkhead.

Livingston was educated at Hillhead Primary School before attending the independent Kelvinside Academy. He married his university contemporary, Deborah, in 1989. They live at Elstree, Hertfordshire, with their two children (one son, one daughter).

Career
After graduating with an economics degree from the University of Manchester at the age of 19, he trained as an accountant with Arthur Andersen, where, on assignment, he became the first chief accountant of The Independent newspaper. Livingston then moved to Bank of America, and then private equity firm 3i.

After being spotted by Sir Stanley Kalms, he moved to the corporate development department of Dixons Group in 1991, before becoming the youngest FTSE 100 finance director at the age of 32.

After the sale of Freeserve, Livingston joined BT Group as finance director, before he took up the post of CEO Retail, on 7 February 2005. He replaced Ben Verwaayen as Group CEO on 1 June 2008.

Livingston was a non-executive director of Celtic F.C., where he was appointed to the board on 1 October 2007. In 2015, after he voted for cutting tax credits, Celtic fans launched a petition to have him removed from the board. Livingston resigned from the board in June 2017.

Livingston became Chairman of Currys plc in August 2017.

References

External links
 Lord Livingston of Parkhead – UK Parliament
 Lord Livingston of Parkhead - www.gov.uk

1964 births
Living people
Scottish Jews
Politicians from Glasgow
Scottish people of Lithuanian-Jewish descent
Scottish people of Polish-Jewish descent
People educated at Kelvinside Academy
Alumni of the University of Manchester
Scottish accountants
3i Group people
British Telecom people
Celtic F.C. directors and chairmen
Conservative Party (UK) life peers
Government ministers of the United Kingdom
Businesspeople from Glasgow
Directors of football clubs in Scotland
Life peers created by Elizabeth II